Cuarius, also Latinised as Curalius, Cuerius, or Coralius, was a river of ancient Boeotia. Strabo suggests that the name was translated to Boeotia from the river of the same name in Thessaly by the Boeotians from their former home there.

References

Geography of ancient Boeotia
Rivers of Greece